The Municipality of Zagorje ob Savi is a municipality in central Slovenia. The seat of the municipality is the town of Zagorje ob Savi. The area is part of the traditional region of Upper Carniola. The entire municipality is now included in the Central Sava Statistical Region. The population of the municipality is about 17,000.

Archaeological evidence shows that the area was already settled in the Late Bronze Age and Iron Age.

Settlements
In addition to the municipal seat of Zagorje ob Savi, the municipality also includes the following settlements:

 Blodnik
 Borje
 Borje pri Mlinšah
 Borovak pri Podkumu
 Brezje
 Breznik
 Briše
 Čemšenik
 Čolnišče
 Dobrljevo
 Dolenja Vas
 Dolgo Brdo pri Mlinšah
 Družina
 Golče
 Gorenja Vas
 Hrastnik pri Trojanah
 Izlake
 Jablana
 Jarše
 Jelenk
 Jelševica
 Jesenovo
 Kal
 Kandrše
 Kisovec
 Kolk
 Kolovrat
 Konjšica
 Kostrevnica
 Kotredež
 Log pri Mlinšah
 Loke pri Zagorju
 Mali Kum
 Medija
 Mlinše
 Mošenik
 Orehovica
 Osredek
 Padež
 Podkraj pri Zagorju
 Podkum
 Podlipovica
 Polšina
 Potoška Vas
 Požarje
 Prapreče
 Ravenska Vas
 Ravne pri Mlinšah
 Razbor pri Čemšeniku
 Razpotje
 Rodež
 Rove
 Rovišče
 Rtiče
 Ržiše
 Selo pri Zagorju
 Šemnik
 Senožeti
 Šentgotard
 Šentlambert
 Šklendrovec
 Sopota
 Špital
 Spodnji Šemnik
 Strahovlje
 Tirna
 Vidrga
 Vine
 Vrh
 Vrh pri Mlinšah
 Vrhe
 Zabava
 Zabreznik
 Zavine
 Zgornji Prhovec
 Znojile
 Žvarulje

References

External links
 
 Zagorje ob Savi municipal site 
 Municipality of Zagorje ob Savi on Geopedia

 
Zagorje ob Savi
1994 establishments in Slovenia